Enter a Murderer is a detective novel by Ngaio Marsh; it is the second novel to feature Roderick Alleyn, and was first published in 1935.  The novel is the first of the theatrical novels for which Marsh was to become famous, taking its title from a line of stage direction in Macbeth, and the plot concerns the on-stage murder of an actor who has managed to antagonize nearly every member of the cast and crew.  Unfortunately for the murderer, Inspector Alleyn is in the audience.  This novel marks the first appearance of Alleyn's sidekick, Inspector Fox.

Plot Summary 
Journalist Nigel Bathgate accompanies his friend Chief Inspector Roderick Alleyn to a production of "The Rat and the Beaver" at the Unicorn Theatre.  The star of the show is Felix Gardener, a friend of Nigel's who plays the titular Rat.  The production is fantastic and Alleyn and Bathgate's eyes are glued to the stage.  In the climax, the Rat makes a dramatic entrance and shoots the Beaver, played by Arthur Surbonadier.  The Beaver stares angrily at the Rat and drops dead.  Only, this is not part of the show.  Arthur Surbonadier really is dead having been shot when the prop bullets in the Rat's gun were switched with real ones.

Alleyn takes control of the investigation and learns nearly everyone in the cast hated Surbonadier.  He fought with Gardener about several things, most importantly actress Stephanie Vaughn.  The prop bullets were stored in a desk and must have been switched when the lights went out before the play began.  Everybody seems to have an alibi.  Veteran actress Susan Max informs Alleyn a pair of grey woollen gloves she knitted have disappeared.  They are later found covered in white stage makeup.  The prop bullets have a similar substance on them.  Alleyn learns very little from his interviews but suspects Props, the prop manager, knows more than he lets on lest because he dropped a chandelier on the stage in an ill-fated attempt to escape.

Alleyn, aided by Bathgate and Inspector Fox, begins to look into Surbonadier's personal life.  The actor's uncle, Jacob Saint, owns the Unicorn and was once the target of a slanderous letter that accused him of being involved in a drug smuggling ring.  The letter was allegedly written by a journalist named Edward Wakeford, but many people believe Arthur wrote it himself as an attempt to blackmail his wealthy uncle.  When Alleyn searches the actor's flat, he finds a what looks like a sheet Arthur used to practice copying Wakeford's signature.  Alleyn arrests Saint for drug smuggling but is coy publicly about what the exact charges are.

Alleyn asks for a recreation of everyone's movements backstage before the play began.  Gardener previously told Alleyn someone stepped on his foot in the dark but when everyone's movements are replayed, no such event happened.  That same night, a police deputy tracks a suspect back to the Unicorn where Props is found hanging from the rafters.  Although it looks like suicide, Alleyn knows it's murder.  Alleyn accuses Felix Gardener of murder.  Initially, Alleyn was at a loss for a motive because Stephanie Vaughn selected Felix over Arthur.  Although Stephanie tried to convince Alleyn it was suicide over having lost her to Felix, the murder of Props said otherwise.  It was Felix who wrote the blackmail letter to Jacob Saint and tried to frame Arthur for it.  The letter was written many years prior so Arthur would not have been likely to keep the signature sheet after all this time.

Characters 

Chief Inspector Roderick Alleyn
Nigel Bathgate
Inspector Fox
Felix Gardener - Nigel's friend, an actor who plays the Rat
Arthur Surbonadier - an actor who plays the Beaver
Stephanie Vaughn - a stage actress who plays the Rat's lover
Jacob Saint - Arthur's uncle, owner of the Unicorn Theatre
Dulcie Deamer - a young actress
J. Barclay Cramer - a veteran stage actor who plays the butler 
Susan Max - a veteran stage actress
Props - the prop manager
Janet Emerald - an actress who plays the Beaver's mistress
George Simpson - the stage manager

External links 
 Realism and Relevancy: Portrayals of the Theatre in Ngaio Marsh’s Enter a Murderer (1935) and Light Thickens (1982)

Roderick Alleyn novels
1935 British novels
Novels about actors
Geoffrey Bles books
British detective novels